Wootz steel, also known as Seric steel, is a crucible steel characterized by a pattern of bands and high carbon content. These bands are formed by sheets of microscopic carbides within a tempered martensite or pearlite matrix in higher carbon steel, or by ferrite and pearlite banding in lower carbon steels. It was a pioneering steel alloy developed in southern India in the mid-1st millennium BC and exported globally.

History

Wootz steel originated in the mid-1st millennium BC in South India, in present-day Tiruchirappalli,  Kodumanal, Erode, Tamil Nadu. There are several ancient Tamil, North Indian, Greek, Chinese and Roman literary references to high carbon Tamil steel. In later times, wootz steel was also made in Golconda in Telangana, Karnataka and Sri Lanka. The steel was exported as cakes of steely iron that came to be known as "Wootz".

The method was to heat black magnetite ore in the presence of carbon in a sealed clay crucible inside a charcoal furnace to completely remove slag. An alternative was to smelt the ore first to give wrought iron, then heat and hammer it to remove slag. The carbon source was bamboo and leaves from plants such as Avārai. The Chinese and locals in Sri Lanka adopted the production methods of creating wootz steel from the Chera Tamils by the 5th century BC. In Sri Lanka, this early steel-making method employed a unique wind furnace, driven by the monsoon winds. Production sites from antiquity have emerged, in places such as Anuradhapura, Tissamaharama and Samanalawewa, as well as imported artifacts of ancient iron and steel from Kodumanal. Recent archaeological excavations (2018) of the Yodhawewa site (in Mannar District) discovered a lower half-spherical furnace, crucible fragments, and lid fragments related to the crucible steel production through the carburization process.  A 200 BC Tamil trade guild in Tissamaharama, in the South East of Sri Lanka, brought with them some of the oldest iron and steel artifacts and production processes to the island from the classical period.

Trade between South India and Sri Lanka through the Arabian Sea introduced wootz steel to Arabia. The term muhannad مهند or hendeyy هندي in pre-Islamic and early Islamic Arabic refers to sword blades made from Indian steel, which were highly prized, and are attested in Arabic poetry. Further trade spread the technology to the city of Damascus, where an industry developed for making weapons of this steel. This led to the development of Damascus steel. The 12th century Arab traveler Edrisi mentioned the "Hinduwani" or Indian steel as the best in the world. Arab accounts also point to the fame of 'Teling' steel, which can be taken to refer to the region of Telangana. The Golconda region of Telangana clearly being the nodal centre for the export of wootz steel to West Asia.

Another sign of its reputation is seen in a Persian phraseto give an "Indian answer", meaning "a cut with an Indian sword". Wootz steel was widely exported and traded throughout ancient Europe and the Arab world, and became particularly famous in the Middle East.

Tipu Sultan's legendary swords are now part of valuable collections in museums of England. The sword had an incredibly hard and sharp edge that could easily rip through the opponent's armour. This quality of the sword came from a special type of high carbon steel called Wootz which was produced all over south India. Wootz steel when made into swords produced a very sharp edge with a flowing water pattern. This pattern came from very small carbon crystals embedded in the iron.

Development of modern metallurgy 

From the 17th century onwards, several European travelers observed the steel manufacturing in South India, at Mysore, Malabar and Golconda. The word "wootz" appears to have originated as a mistranscription of wook; the Tamil language root word for the alloy is urukku. Anothertheory says that the word is a variation of uchcha or ucha  ("superior"). According to one theory, the word ukku is based on the meaning "melt, dissolve". Other Dravidian languages have similar-sounding words for steel: ukku in Kannada and Telugu, and urukku in Malayalam. When Benjamin Heyne inspected the Indian steel in Ceded Districts and other Kannada-speaking areas, he was informed that the steel was ucha kabbina ("superior iron"), also known as ukku tundu in Mysore.

Legends of wootz steel and Damascus swords aroused the curiosity of the European scientific community from the 17th to the 19th century. The use of high-carbon alloys was little known in Europe previously and thus the research into wootz steel played an important role in the development of modern English, French and Russian metallurgy.

In 1790, samples of wootz steel were received by Sir Joseph Banks, president of the British Royal Society, sent by Helenus Scott. These samples were subjected to scientific examination and analysis by several experts.

Specimens of daggers and other weapons were sent by the Rajas of India to the Great Exhibition in London in 1851 and 1862 International Exhibition. Though the arms of the swords were beautifully decorated and jeweled, they were most highly prized for the quality of their steel. The swords of the Sikhs were said to bear bending and crumpling, and yet be fine and sharp.

Characteristics
Wootz is characterized by a pattern caused by bands of clustered  particles made by melting of low levels of carbide-forming elements. Wootz contains greater carbonaceous matter than common qualities of cast steel.

The distinct patterns of Wootz steel that can be made through forging are wave, ladder, and rose patterns with finely spaced bonds. However, with hammering, dyeing, and etching further customized patterns were made.

The presence of cementite nanowires, and carbon nanotubes has been identified by Peter Pepler of TU Dresden in the microstructure of wootz steel. There is a possibility of an abundance of ultrahard metallic carbides in the steel matrix precipitating out in bands. Wootz swords were renowned for their sharpness and toughness.

Composition 
T. H. Henry analyzed and recorded the composition of wootz steel samples provided by the Royal School of Mines. Recording:

Carbon (Combined) 1.34%

Carbon (Uncombined) 0.31%

Sulfur 0.17%

Silicon 0.04%

Arsenic 0.03%

Wootz steel was analyzed by Faraday and recorded to contain 0.01-0.07% aluminium. Faraday, Messrs, and Stodart hypothesized that aluminium was needed in the steel and was important in forming the excellent properties of wootz steel. However T. H. Henry deduced that presence of aluminium in the Wootz used by these studies was due to slag, forming as silicates. Percy later reiterated that the quality of wootz steel does not depend on the presence of aluminium.

Reproduction research

Wootz steel has been reproduced and studied in depth by the Royal School of Mines. Dr. Pearson was the first to chemically examine wootz in 1795 and he published his contributions to the Philosophical Transactions of the Royal Society.

Russian metallurgist Pavel Petrovich Anosov (see Bulat steel) was almost able to reproduce ancient Wootz steel with nearly all of its properties and the steel he created was very similar to traditional Wootz. He documented four different methods of producing Wootz steel that exhibited traditional patterns. He died before he could fully document and publish his research. Oleg Sherby and Jeff Wadsworth and Lawrence Livermore National Laboratory have all done research, attempting to create steels with characteristics similar to Wootz, but without success. J.D Verhoeven and Alfred Pendray reconstructed methods of production, proved the role of impurities of ore in the pattern creation, and reproduced Wootz steel with patterns microscopically and visually identical to one of the ancient blade patterns. Reibold et al.'s analyses spoke of the presence of carbon nanotubes enclosing nanowires of cementite, with the trace elements/impurities of vanadium, molybdenum, chromium etc. contributing to their creation, in cycles of heating/cooling/forging. This resulted in a hard high carbon steel that remained malleable

There are other smiths who are now consistently producing Wootz steel blades visually identical to the old patterns. Steel manufactured in Kutch particularly enjoyed a widespread reputation, similar to those manufactured at Glasgow and Sheffield.

Wootz was made over nearly a 2,000-year period (the oldest sword samples date to around 200 AD) and the methods of production of ingots, the ingredients, and the methods of forging varied from one area to the next. Some Wootz blades displayed a pattern, while some did not. Heat treating was quite different from forging, and there were many different patterns which were created by the various smiths who spanned from China to Scandinavia.

See also
Toledo steel
Damascus steel
Noric steel
Bulat steel
Tamahagane steel
 Ferrous metallurgy
 Iron pillar of Delhi
 Pattern welding

References

Further reading
 
 
 
 urukku - from the Tamil Lexicon, University of Madras

External links
 
 
 
 Wootz Militaria
 Archived at Ghostarchive and the Wayback Machine: 
 Archived at Ghostarchive and the Wayback Machine: 
 

Steels
History of India
Indian inventions
History of metallurgy
Economic history of Tamil Nadu
Chera dynasty
Tamilakam